Si Ma Cai is a rural district of Lào Cai province in the Northeast region of Vietnam. As of 2003, the district had a population of 25,554. The district covers an area of 241 km2. The district capital lies at Si Ma Cai.

Administrative divisions
Si Ma Cai, Thào Chư Phìn, Bản Mế, Sán Chải, Lùng Sui, Mản Thẩn, Cán Hồ, Sín Chéng, Lử Thẩn, Quan Thần Sán, Cán Cấu, Nàn Sín and Nàn Sán.

References

Districts of Lào Cai province
Lào Cai province